VYSO may refer to:
 Vancouver Youth Symphony Orchestra, Canada
Victorian Youth Symphony Orchestra, Australia